Henry Charles Grote (August 28, 1874 – January 21, 1947) was an American diver. He competed in the men's 3 metre springboard event at the 1908 Summer Olympics.

Career
During the 1906 national swimming championships in Laughlin's Lake, Grote finished in third place, beating Frank Bornaman who represented America during the 1896 Summer Olympics and Dr. Sheldon who was then the national indoor champion.

In 1908, while competing in western swimming tryouts in Chicago, he sustained an injury during a dive which forced him to withdraw from the event. In the run up to the 1908 Summer Olympics, Grote was not originally selected by the committee responsible for selection but was instead added to the reserve list, only being notified quite late that he could be entered at London if he could raise trip expenses of $325. With the help of friends, he raised around $180 by patrons of the Cherry Diamond Swimming Tank, while his swimming club offered to pay the remaining difference of $150, else he may not have been able to participate. During the Olympics, he failed to qualify for the final trials and took a short trip around Germany after the games.

References

External links
 

1874 births
1947 deaths
American male divers
Olympic divers of the United States
Divers at the 1908 Summer Olympics
20th-century American people